Johan Heindrich Schroeder le Roux (born 15 November 1961) is a former South African rugby union player.

Playing career
He was part of the strong 1993 Transvaal side that won the Super 10 against Auckland. He toured with the Springboks to New Zealand in 1994, playing in two test matches and four tour matches. After the Test match against New Zealand at Athletic Park, Le Roux was cited for biting the ear of All Black captain, Sean Fitzpatrick. He was subsequently suspended for 18 months, effectively ending his international rugby career.

Test history

See also
List of South Africa national rugby union players – Springbok no. 608

References

1961 births
Living people
South African rugby union players
South Africa international rugby union players
Golden Lions players
Falcons (rugby union) players
Rugby union players from Gauteng
Rugby union props